The Pelloux II government of Italy held office from 14 May 1899 until 24 June 1900, a total of 407 days, or 1 year, 1 month and 10 days.

Government parties
The government was composed by the following parties:

Composition

References

Italian governments
1899 establishments in Italy